Christian McLeer, an American composer is a graduate of the Juilliard Conservatory Pre-College, and Manhattan School of Music. At the age of fourteen he received his first major commission for the American Cancer Society for which he wrote and performed Hope in concert. Since then, he has composed a number of works that have been commissioned and recorded including his one-act opera House of Comedy, an avant-garde piece entitled Feedback Parade, the ballet The Grandfather Clocks, and the opera Haibo. His composition Musing is included on acclaimed flutist Sophia Anastasia's CD of the same name and Hope is included on the CD Encores 2 by the world-renowned pianist Anna Marie Bottazzi. His work, Black Lung was included on the 60x60 project. As a concert pianist Christian has performed at many respected venues including Weill-Carnegie Hall, Steinway Hall, Merkin Concert Hall and the New Orleans Astro Dome. He has also performed as a conductor with the New Music Consort. An accomplished classical, jazz, pop and rock musician, he is recognized as having the ability to unite these genres in his compositions. He co-founded the Remarkable Theater Brigade and is the musical director at Jan Hus Presbyterian Church. He currently is a high school chorus teacher.

Discography
Requiem 
Encores 2
Musing

References

American male classical composers
American classical composers
20th-century classical composers
21st-century classical composers
Living people
Manhattan School of Music alumni
Juilliard School Pre-College Division alumni
21st-century American composers
20th-century American composers
20th-century American male musicians
21st-century American male musicians
Year of birth missing (living people)